Safawi (Arabic: الصفاوي) is a town in Mafraq Governorate, in Jordan.

Geography
Safawi is located in the northern desert region of Jordan, in Mafraq Governorate.

Economy
Safawi is located on the highway connecting Amman to Baghdad. Hamza oil well, one of the few oil wells in Jordan, is near Safawi.

Populated places in Mafraq Governorate